City by the Sea is a 2002 American crime drama film starring Robert De Niro, James Franco, Eliza Dushku, Frances McDormand and William Forsythe. It deals with the family problems of a wayward youth and is set against a man trying to break free of his past. It was directed by Michael Caton-Jones. It is based on the story of Vincent LaMarca.

Plot
Vincent LaMarca (Robert De Niro) is a veteran New York City Police Department detective. When Vincent was only 8 years old, his father was executed for murder, because a child whom his father (also a cop but desperate for money) had kidnapped for ransom died when in his care. Vincent feels guilty for his father's deed, and has tried to redeem himself; he works hard and well as a cop despite the stigma of being the son of a murderer. Although he used to live in Long Beach, Vincent now lives in New York City.

Vincent has a son called Joey La Marca (James Franco). Joey is still in Long Beach, but he is a homeless junkie. Vincent last saw Joey 14 years ago, when Vincent walked out on his son and his son's mother, and went to live by himself. He has told his current girlfriend, Michelle (Frances McDormand), that he has no children.

Then Vincent's son, Joey, is implicated in a drug-related killing out in Long Beach. Vincent is unwilling to help his son, and Michelle cannot understand why.

Joey's girlfriend, Gina (Eliza Dushku) is struggling to stay sober for the sake of her infant son, Angelo; Joey is the father of the child. Gina pleads with Vincent to try to save Joey. Gina later abandons the child, leaving the toddler with Vincent.

Vincent's cop partner, Reg (George Dzundza) is sympathetic to Vincent's situation, and is trying to help Vincent clear Joey of the drug-related killing. On the basis of a tip-off, Reg and another policeman are in Long Beach searching an abandoned and ruined casino where Joey is thought to sleep, to try to take Joey in for questioning. During the search, Reg is brutally shot and killed. The second cop assumes that Joey killed Reg, and is unaware that Reg was killed by the ruthless local drug enforcer, Spyder (William Forsythe).

Joey is now thought to be responsible for two murders, including killing a cop. A massive police search is launched to stop this "armed and dangerous cop-killer". It looks as if the police will probably shoot and kill Joey if they can locate him.

Vincent decides he has to do whatever he can to save his estranged son, for the sake of his son, but also for the sake of his little grandson, so that his grandson can grow up with a mother and a father. Vincent decides he cannot stay "disappeared" from his son's and grandson's life, in the same way his own father disappeared from his life when he was a child. Vincent discovers proof that Spyder killed Reg.

After a difficult search, Vincent finds Spyder, but is now confronted at gunpoint. When Joey arrives, he shoots Spyder dead in self-defense. Joey still does not trust Vincent and thinks that his father only wants to arrest him—cop first, father second. Eventually Vincent is able to persuade his son that he cares for him. When other police hone in on them, Vincent uses his own body to block his son's body so that police cannot shoot Joey without first shooting him.

Joey is taken into custody without violence and father and son exchange a small smile before he is taken away.

Cast
 Robert De Niro as Vincent LaMarca
 Frances McDormand as Michelle
 James Franco as Joey LaMarca
 Eliza Dushku as Gina
 William Forsythe as Spyder 
 George Dzundza as Reg Duffy
 Patti LuPone as Maggie LaMarca
 Anson Mount as Dave Simon
 John Doman as Henderson
 Brian Tarantina as Snake
 Drena De Niro as Vanessa Hansen
 Nestor Serrano as Rossi
 Michael P. Moran as Herb 
 Michael Della Femina as Angelo LaMarca (Vincent's father) 
 Dominick Angelo and Pasquale Enrico Cangro as Baby Angelo (Joey and Gina's son)

Production

Filming took place in early 2001. The story is primarily set in Long Beach, New York, a beachfront town on the south shore of Long Island, for which the municipal motto is "Civitas ad Mare", Latin for "City by the Sea". However, the on-location scenes in the film that supposedly show the town of Long Beach were in fact shot in Asbury Park, New Jersey. The film features many aspects of a town that appears to be partially ruined, including scenes of a shabby boardwalk and an abandoned casino/arcade building. There is a disclaimer in the credits at the end of the film which explicitly states that the film was not shot in Long Beach.

Some other scenes in the film show New York City (including the World Trade Center; the shots were not edited out after the September 11 attacks).

Reception
City by the Sea received mixed reviews from critics. Rotten Tomatoes gave the film a 48% rating based on reviews from 144 critics, with an average rating of 5.8/10. On Metacritic, it has a weighted average score of 50 out of 100, based on 34 critics, indicating "mixed or average reviews". Audiences polled by CinemaScore gave the film an average grade of "B" on an A+ to F scale.

Notes
 "Mark of a murderer" by Mike McAlary, Esquire magazine, 1997

References

External links
 
 
  
 
 

2002 films
2002 crime drama films
2002 independent films
American crime drama films
American independent films
Crime films based on actual events
Drama films based on actual events
Films about dysfunctional families
Films directed by Michael Caton-Jones
Films scored by John Murphy (composer)
Films set in New York (state)
Films shot in New Jersey
Films shot in New York (state)
Films produced by Don Carmody
Franchise Pictures films
American neo-noir films
Impact of the September 11 attacks on cinema
Warner Bros. films
Films produced by Elie Samaha
Films about father–son relationships
2000s English-language films
2000s American films